Pablo Díaz Vázquez (born 14 December 1981) is a Spanish footballer who plays for CD La Madalena de Morcín as midfielder.

Football career
Díaz was born in Oviedo, Asturias. During his career, spent mainly in the lower leagues and in his native region, he represented Real Oviedo, Atlético Madrid B, Rayo Vallecano, Cultural y Deportiva Leonesa, Marino de Luanco (twice), UE Lleida, Caudal Deportivo, Real Avilés, Luarca CF, UP Langreo and CD Tuilla.

In the early 2000s, Díaz played in two Segunda División seasons with Oviedo, being a regular first-team unit and suffering relegation in his second year.

Honours
Atlético Madrid B
Segunda División B: 2003–04

External links
 
 
 
 

1981 births
Living people
Footballers from Oviedo
Spanish footballers
Association football midfielders
Segunda División players
Segunda División B players
Tercera División players
Real Oviedo Vetusta players
Real Oviedo players
Atlético Madrid B players
Rayo Vallecano players
Cultural Leonesa footballers
Marino de Luanco footballers
UE Lleida players
Caudal Deportivo footballers
Real Avilés CF footballers
UP Langreo footballers